Corn earworm may refer to:

 Helicoverpa armigera, a species of moth widespread across Europe, Asia, Africa, Australia, and Oceania
 Helicoverpa zea, a species of moth widespread across the Americas